Thomas, Tom or Tommy Hill may refer to:

People

Politics 
 Thomas Hill (died 1557) (by 1500 – 1557), English Member of Parliament for Worcester and Heytesbury
 Thomas Hill (Leominster MP) (1721–1776), British Member of Parliament for Leominster
 Thomas Hill (Sauk County, Wisconsin politician), member of the Wisconsin State Assembly
 Thomas Hill (Shrewsbury MP) (fl. 1749–1768), British Member of Parliament for Shrewsbury
 Thomas A. Hill (1889–1937), American politician in the Arkansas House of Representatives
 Thomas E. Hill (politician) (fl. 1967–70), American politician (Ohio)
 Thomas Rowley Hill (1816–1896), British Member of Parliament for Worcester, 1874–1885
 Thomas W. Hill (1817–1879), American politician (Wisconsin)

Arts 
 Thomas Hill (author) (c. 1528 – after 1577), English astrologer, author and translator
 Thomas E. Hill (author) (1832–1915), American author of self-help books
 Thomas Hill (sculptor) (died 1713,) English sculptor and mason of the dome of St Paul's Cathedral
 Thomas Noel Hill, 2nd Baron Berwick (1770–1832), British peer and art patron
 Thomas Hill (painter) (1829–1908), American painter
 Thomas Hill (actor) (1927–2009), American actor
 Tom Hill (born 1950), British bass guitarist in glam rock band Geordie
 Thomas Hill (clarinetist) (active from 1983), principal clarinetist with the Boston Philharmonic and member of the Boston Chamber Music

Education, philosophy or religion 
 Thomas Hill (Cambridge) (died 1653), English academic, Master of Emmanuel College, Cambridge and of Trinity College, Cambridge
 Thomas Wright Hill (1763–1851), British mathematician and schoolmaster, father of Rowland Hill, the originator of the modern postal system
 Thomas Hill (priest) (died 1875), British Anglican clergyman
 Thomas Hill (clergyman) (1818–1891), American Unitarian, president of Antioch College and Harvard University, inventor
 Thomas E. Hill (academic) (born 1937), American philosopher and academic
 Thomas Hill (Dean of Ossory) (1634–1671)

Sports 
 Tom Hill (footballer) (1871–?), English footballer
 Thomas Hill (footballer, born 1901), English footballer for Bolton United, Bradford City, and Walsall
 Thomas Hill (footballer, born 2002), English footballer for Liverpool
 Thomas Seymour Hill (1893–1977), Australian rules football administrator
 Thomas Hill (hurdler) (born 1949), American track and field athlete
 Thomas Hill (basketball) (born 1971), American basketball player
 Tom Hill (judoka) (born 1974), Australian judoka
 Tommy Hill (born 1985), British motorcycle road racer
 Thomas Hill (rugby league), Welsh international rugby league player

Other people 
 Thomas Noel Hill (1784–1832), British Army officer of the Napoleonic Wars
 Thomas Hill of Dennis (died 1824), Welsh ironmaster
 Tom Hill (scout), Lenape mountain man active in the American frontier

Characters
 Tommy Hill (Twin Peaks), fictional character in the U.S. television series Twin Peaks

Other uses
 Thomas Hill, Missouri, a community in the United States
 Thomas Hill (Hamilton County, New York), a summit located in the Adirondack Mountains of New York
 Thomas Hill (manufacturer), company in England which made and repaired road vehicles and railway locomotives
 Tom Hill (Massachusetts), a mountain in Barnstable County, Massachusetts

See also 
 Hill (surname)